This is a list of the largest cities and towns based on population in state of Terengganu, Malaysia.

References